KXDL (99.7 FM, "Hot Rod Radio") is a radio station licensed to serve Browerville, Minnesota, United States, with studios located in Long Prairie, Minnesota. The station is owned by Doug Frauenholtz, through licensee D&K Distributors, Inc.

KXDL broadcasts a Classic Rock music format.

The station was assigned the KXDL call sign by the Federal Communications Commission on July 12, 1990.

References

External links
Hot Rod Radio official website

Radio stations in Alexandria, Minnesota
Classic rock radio stations in the United States
Radio stations established in 1997
Todd County, Minnesota